The 2013–14 Northeastern Huskies men's basketball team represented Northeastern University during the 2013–14 NCAA Division I men's basketball season. The Huskies, led by eighth year head coach Bill Coen, played their home games at Matthews Arena and were members of the Colonial Athletic Association. They finished the season 11–21, 7–9 in CAA play to finish in fifth place. They advanced to the semifinals of the CAA tournament where they lost to Delaware.

Roster

Schedule

|-
!colspan=9 style="background:#CC0000; color:#000000;"| Regular season

|-
!colspan=9 style="background:#CC0000; color:#000000;"| 2014 CAA tournament

References

Northeastern Huskies men's basketball seasons
Northeastern